Adrian Ryan Lynch (February 9, 1897 – March 16, 1934) was a Major League Baseball pitcher who appeared in five games, three of which were starts, for the St. Louis Browns in .

External links

1897 births
1934 deaths
Notre Dame Fighting Irish baseball players
St. Louis Browns players
Major League Baseball pitchers
Baseball players from Iowa
People from Laurens, Iowa